Justin Hocking (born January 9, 1974) is a Canadian former professional ice hockey defenceman who played one game in the National Hockey League (NHL) with the Los Angeles Kings during the 1993–94 NHL season.

Born in Stettler, Alberta, Hocking was selected in the second round (39th overall) in the 1992 NHL Entry Draft by the Los Angeles Kings.

Hocking also played in the International Hockey League, ECHL, American Hockey League  and later in the British Ice Hockey Superleague.

Career statistics

See also
List of players who played only one game in the NHL

External links

1974 births
Canadian ice hockey defencemen
Fort Saskatchewan Traders players
Grand Rapids Griffins players
Ice hockey people from Alberta
Indianapolis Ice players
Knoxville Cherokees players
Living people
Los Angeles Kings draft picks
Los Angeles Kings players
Manchester Storm (1995–2002) players
Medicine Hat Tigers players
Phoenix Roadrunners (IHL) players
Portland Pirates players
Prince Edward Island Senators players
St. John's Maple Leafs players
Spokane Chiefs players
Springfield Falcons players
Syracuse Crunch players
Worcester IceCats players
Canadian expatriate ice hockey players in England